Raven in the Snow is an album by the Native American musician Bill Miller, released in 1995. The first two singles were "River of Time" and the title track. Miller supported the album by opening shows for the BoDeans and then Tish Hinojosa.

Production
Produced by Richard Bennett, the album was recorded in Nashville. "In Every Corner of the Forest" is a three-part instrumental that was inspired by a Mike Watt/Eddie Vedder show; much of the rest of the album was influenced by the Byrds and Richie Havens. Miller played flute on Raven in the Snow, and was supported by an electric band on most of the songs. Miller wrote many of the songs with members of his backing band. Miller chose the album's rock sound in part due to commercial considerations.

Critical reception

USA Today called the "rocking" Raven in the Snow "one of the most powerful and poetic releases of the year." The Vancouver Sun wrote: "From Dylan-esque harp leads to crunching, spellbinding backbeats, Miller combines the best of all worlds to come up with straightforward folk-rock with a little something extra." City Pages considered the album "an uncategorizable mix of smart Triple-A pop and meditative tribal rhythms, with strong echoes of Dylan's best '70s stuff."

The Record labeled the album "a multi-faceted musical masterpiece," writing that the songs "are fresh and crackle with fine, crisp musicianship." The Plain Dealer determined that Miller's music "isn't prefabricated and delves into important and uncomfortable themes concerning America's treatment of its native people."

AllMusic deemed "River of Time" "a harmonica-driven, midtempo rocker that compares favorably with the music of artists like Peter Himmelman." The Mercury News listed Raven in the Snow among the best albums of 1995.

Track listing

References

1995 albums
Reprise Records albums